Tanggai dance (also known as the Long Fingernail dance), is an Indonesian traditional dance performed to welcome people to weddings. The dance is practiced in Palembang.

See also

 Gendhing
 Srivijaya

References 

Dances of Sumatra
Palembang